Mashpee Commons is located in Mashpee, Massachusetts, United States. It is an open-air shopping center that is built in the style of New England town centers. It is world-renowned, winning many awards and recognitions over the years because of its style.

History

Early years
Mashpee Commons originally started out in the 1960s as any other shopping center would. Then, it was known as the New Seabury Shopping Center. There was originally  of retail floor area and a large, asphalt parking lot in front of it. The food store evolved into a Star Market over time until it was eventually closed around 2006 and divided up into shops. The theater lived on into today's Regal Cinemas.

Transformation
In 1986, the shopping center was bought and redeveloped over the years into Mashpee Commons. The original building at the site took place in the Stop & Shop section of the development, the east side of Route 151. Areas fronting 151 also were part of the original development. Over the years the old grounds for the traveling fairs were built up into shops and other places.

Future

There are many plans in place concerning the future of the shopping center. The developers plan to add more housing and businesses as well as giving it a village style green. This is important because before there was ever a commons, there was no center of town in Mashpee. This can be traced to it being a reservation to the Wampanoag, who were very different from the white settlers.

Community events
The owners of Mashpee Commons are community oriented. During various stages of the year, they host concerts, fireworks, Oktoberfest, and many other events.

References

1986 establishments in Massachusetts
Buildings and structures in Barnstable County, Massachusetts
Mashpee, Massachusetts
New Classical architecture
Shopping malls in Massachusetts
Shopping malls established in 1986
Tourist attractions in Barnstable County, Massachusetts